The 2019 Players' Championship was held from April 9 to 14 at the Mattamy Athletic Centre in Toronto, Ontario. It was the seventh Grand Slam event of the 2018–19 curling season.

In the men's final, Brendan Bottcher defeated Kevin Koe 6–1. Team Bottcher was playing in their third straight  Grand Slam final. In the women's final, Kerri Einarson defeated Anna Hasselborg 5–4 in an extra end. It was the second final that Team Einarson played in that season.

Qualification
The top 12 ranked men's and women's teams on the World Curling Tour's Year-to-Date ranking as of March 11 qualified for the event.

Men
Top Year-to-Date men's teams as of March 11:
 Kevin Koe
 Brad Jacobs
 Brendan Bottcher
 Bruce Mouat
 Niklas Edin
 John Epping
 Brad Gushue
 Ross Paterson
 Glenn Howard
 Matt Dunstone
 Peter de Cruz
 Reid Carruthers

Women
Top Year-to-Date women's teams as of March 11:
 Rachel Homan
 Anna Hasselborg
 Kerri Einarson
 Silvana Tirinzoni
 Jennifer Jones
 Chelsea Carey
 Satsuki Fujisawa
 Tracy Fleury
 Robyn Silvernagle
 Casey Scheidegger
 Alina Kovaleva
 Sayaka Yoshimura
 Elena Stern

Men

Teams
The teams are listed as follows:

Round-robin standings
Final round-robin standings

Round-robin results
All draw times are listed in Eastern Daylight Time (UTC-4).

Draw 1
Tuesday, April 9, 7:00 pm

Draw 2
Wednesday, April 10, 8:30 am

Draw 3
Wednesday, April 10, 12:00 pm

Draw 4
Wednesday, April 10, 4:00 pm

Draw 5
Wednesday, April 10, 8:00 pm

Draw 6
Thursday, April 11, 8:30 am

Draw 7
Thursday, April 11, 12:00 pm

Draw 8
Thursday, April 11, 4:00 pm

Draw 9
Thursday, April 11, 8:00 pm

Draw 10
Friday, April 12, 8:30 am

Draw 11
 
Friday, April 12, 12:00 pm

Draw 13
Friday, April 12, 8:00 pm

Tiebreakers
Saturday, April 13, 8:30 am

Saturday, April 13, 12:00 pm

Playoffs

Quarterfinals
Saturday, April 13, 4:00 pm

Semifinals
Saturday, April 13, 8:00 pm

Final
Sunday, April 14, 12:00 pm

Women

Teams
The teams are listed as follows:

Round-robin standings
Final round-robin standings

Round-robin results
All draw times are listed in Eastern Daylight Time (UTC-4).

Draw 1
Tuesday, April 9, 7:00 pm

Draw 2
Wednesday, April 10, 8:30 am

Draw 3
Wednesday, April 10, 12:00 pm

Draw 4
Wednesday, April 10, 4:00 pm

Draw 5
 
Wednesday, April 10, 8:00 pm

Draw 6
Thursday, April 11, 8:30 am

Draw 7
Thursday, April 11, 12:00 pm

Draw 8
Thursday, April 11, 4:00 pm

Draw 9
Thursday, April 11, 8:00 pm

Draw 10
Friday, April 12, 8:30 am

Draw 12
 
Friday, April 12, 4:00 pm

Tiebreaker
Friday, April 12, 8:00 pm

Playoffs

Quarterfinals
Saturday, April 13, 12:00 pm

Semifinals
Saturday, April 13, 8:00 pm

Final
Sunday, April 14, 4:00 pm

Notes

References

External links

Players' Championship
Players' Championship
Players' Championship
Players' Championship
Curling in Toronto
Sports competitions in Toronto